Alison Brown is emerita professor in the department of history at Royal Holloway, University of London. Brown is a specialist in the history of Renaissance Italy.

Selected publications
Bartolomeo Scala, 1430-1497, Chancellor of Florence: the humanist as bureaucrat. Princeton, N.J., Princeton University Press, 1979.
The Renaissance. London, Longman, 1988. (Seminar Studies in History)
Language and images of Renaissance Italy. Oxford, Clarendon Press, 1995. (Editor)
Contested Space: Street Trading, Public Space, and Livelihoods in Developing Countries. Rugby, ITDG Publishing, 2006.
The return of Lucretius to Renaissance Florence. Cambridge, Mass.: Harvard University Press, 2010.
Medicean and Savonarolan Florence: the interplay of politics, humanism, and religion, Brepols, 2011.
Piero di Lorenzo de' Medici and the Crisis of Renaissance Italy, Cambridge University Press, 2020

References

External links
Alison Brown speaking on Machiavelli's The Prince.

Academics of Royal Holloway, University of London
British historians
British women historians
Historians of the Renaissance

Living people
Year of birth missing (living people)